Sunday is the day of the week between Saturday and Monday. In most Western countries, Sunday is a day of rest and a part of the weekend. It is often considered the first day of the week.

For most observant adherents of Christianity, Sunday is generally observed as a day of worship and rest, recognising it as the Lord's Day and the day of Christ's resurrection; in the United States, Canada, Japan, the Philippines as well as in most of South America, Sunday is the first day of the week. According to the Hebrew calendar and traditional calendars (including Christian calendars) Sunday is the first day of the week; Quaker Christians call Sunday the "first day" in accordance with their testimony of simplicity. The International Organization for Standardization, which is based in Switzerland, calls Sunday the seventh day of the week.

Etymology

The name "Sunday", the day of the Sun, is derived from Hellenistic astrology, where the seven planets, known in English as Saturn, Jupiter, Mars, the Sun, Venus, Mercury and the Moon, each had an hour of the day assigned to them, and the planet which was regent during the first hour of any day of the week gave its name to that day. During the 1st and 2nd century, the week of seven days was introduced into Rome from Egypt, and the Roman names of the planets were given to each successive day.

Germanic peoples seem to have adopted the week as a division of time from the Romans, but they changed the Roman names into those of corresponding Teutonic deities. Hence, the dies Solis became Sunday (German, Sonntag).

The English noun Sunday derived sometime before 1250 from sunedai, which itself developed from Old English (before 700) Sunnandæg (literally meaning "sun's day"), which is cognate to other Germanic languages, including Old Frisian sunnandei, Old Saxon sunnundag, Middle Dutch sonnendach (modern Dutch zondag), Old High German sunnun tag (modern German Sonntag), and Old Norse sunnudagr (Danish and Norwegian søndag, Icelandic sunnudagur and Swedish söndag). The Germanic term is a Germanic interpretation of Latin dies solis ("day of the sun"), which is a translation of the ancient Greek Ἥλίου ημέρα" (Hēlíou hēméra).

In most Indian languages, the word for Sunday is derived from Sanskrit Ravivāra or Adityavāra — vāra meaning day and Aditya and Ravi both being names for Surya, the Sun and the solar deity. Ravivāra is the first day cited in Jyotisha, which provides logical reason for giving the name of each week day. In the Thai solar calendar, the name ("Waan Arthit") is derived from Aditya, and the associated colour is red.

In Russian, the word for Sunday is  meaning “resurrection” (that is, the day of a week which commemorates the resurrection of Jesus Christ). In Old Russian, Sunday was also called , “free day”, or “day with no work”, but in the contemporary language this word means “week”.

The Lord's Day.

The name is similar in the Romance Languages. In Italian, Sunday is called , which also means “Lord's Day” (from Latin ).

It is usually combined with the word  meaning “day”.

Position in the week

ISO 8601
The international standard ISO 8601 for representation of dates and times, states that Sunday is the seventh and last day of the week. This method of representing dates and times unambiguously was first published in 1988.

Culture and languages

In the Judaic, Christian, as well as in some Islamic tradition, Sunday has been considered the first day of the week. A number of languages express this position either by the name for the day or by the naming of the other days. In Hebrew it is called יום ראשון yom rishon, in Arabic الأحد al-ahad, in Persian and related languages یکشنبه yek-shanbe, all meaning "first".

In Greek, the names of the days Monday, Tuesday, Wednesday, and Thursday (and ) mean “second”, “third”, “fourth”, and “fifth”, respectively. This leaves Sunday in the first position of the week count. Similarly in Portuguese, where the days from Monday to Friday are counted as "segunda-feira", "terça-feira", "quarta-feira", "quinta-feira" and "sexta-feira". In Vietnamese, the working days in the week are named as: Thứ Hai (Second), Thứ Ba (Third), Thứ Tư (Fourth), Thứ Năm (Fifth), Thứ Sáu (Sixth), and Thứ Bảy (Seventh). Sunday is called "Chủ Nhật"(chữ Hán: 主日) meaning “Lord's Day”. Some colloquial text in the south of Vietnam and from the church may use a different reading of "Chúa Nhật"(in contemporary Vietnamese, "Chúa" means God or Lord and "Chủ" means own). In German, Wednesday is called Mittwoch, literally “mid-week”, implying the week runs from Sunday to Saturday.

Slavic languages implicitly number Monday as day number one. 

Russian воскресение (Sunday) means “resurrection”.
Hungarian szerda (Wednesday), csütörtök (Thursday), and péntek (Friday) are Slavic loanwords, so the correlation with “middle”, “four”, and “five” are not evident to Hungarian speakers. Hungarians use Vasárnap for Sunday, which means “market day”.

In the Maltese language, due to its Siculo-Arabic origin, Sunday is called Il-Ħadd, a corruption of wieħed, meaning “one”. Monday is It-Tnejn, meaning "two". Similarly, Tuesday is It-Tlieta (three), Wednesday is L-Erbgħa (four), and Thursday is Il-Ħamis (five).

In Armenian, Monday is Yerkoushabti, literally meaning “second day of the week”, Tuesday Yerekshabti “third day”, Wednesday Chorekshabti “fourth day”, Thursday Hingshabti “fifth day”. Saturday is Shabat coming from the word Sabbath or Shabbath in Hebrew, and Kiraki, coming from the word Krak, meaning “fire”, is Sunday, referring to the sun as a fire. Apostle John, in Revelations 1:10, refers to the “Lord's Day”,  (kyriakḗ hēmera), that is, “the day of the Lord”, possibly influencing the Armenian word for Sunday.

In many European countries, calendars show Monday as the first day of the week, which follows the ISO 8601 standard.

In the Persian calendar, Sunday is the second day of the week. However, it is called “number one” as counting starts from zero; the first day - Saturday - is denoted as day zero.

Sunday in Christianity

Pagan correspondence

In Roman culture, Sunday was the day of the Sun god. In pagan theology, the Sun was the source of life, giving warmth and illumination to mankind. It was the center of a popular cult among Romans, who would stand at dawn to catch the first rays of sunshine as they prayed.

The opportunity to spot in the nature-worship of their heathen neighbors a symbolism valid to their own faith was not lost on the Christians. One of the Church fathers, St. Jerome, would declare: "If pagans call [the Lord's Day] [...] the 'day of the sun,' we willingly agree, for today the light of the world is raised, today is revealed the sun of justice with healing in his rays."

A similar consideration may have influenced the choice of the date of Christmas as the day of the winter solstice, whose celebration was part of the Roman cult of the Sun. In the same vein, Christian churches have been built and are still being built (as far as possible) with an orientation so that the congregation faced toward the sunrise in the East. Much later, St. Francis would sing in his famous canticle: "Be praised, my Lord, through all your creatures, especially through my lord Brother Sun, who brings the day; and you give light through him. And he is beautiful and radiant in all his splendor! Of you, Most High, he bears the likeness."

Christian usage

The ancient Romans traditionally used the eight-day nundinal cycle, a market week, but in the time of Augustus in the 1st century AD, a seven-day week also came into use.

In the gospels, the women are described as coming to the empty tomb  although its often translated "on the first day of the week".

Justin Martyr, in the mid 2nd century, mentions "memoirs of the apostles" as being read on "the day called that of the sun" (Sunday) alongside the "writings of the prophets."

On 7 March 321, Constantine I, Rome's first Christian Emperor, decreed that Sunday would be observed as the Roman day of rest:

Despite the official adoption of Sunday as a day of rest by Constantine, the seven-day week and the mundial cycle continued to be used side by side until at least the Calendar of 354 and probably later.

In 363, Canon 29 of the Council of Laodicea prohibited observance of the Jewish Sabbath (Saturday), and encouraged Christians to work on the Saturday and rest on the Lord's Day (Sunday). The fact that the canon had to be issued at all is an indication that adoption of Constantine's decree of 321 was still not universal, not even among Christians. It also indicates that Jews were observing the Sabbath on the Saturday.

Modern practices
First-day Sabbatarians, including Christians of the Methodist, Baptist and Reformed (Presbyterian and Congregationalist) traditions, observe Sunday as the sabbath, a day devoted to the worship of God at church (the attendance of Sunday School, a service of worship in the morning and evening), as well as a day of rest (meaning that people are free from servile labour and should refrain from trading, buying and selling except when necessary).

For most Christians the custom and obligation of Sunday rest is not as strict. A minority of Christians do not regard the day they attend church as important, so long as they attend. There is considerable variation in the observance of Sabbath rituals and restrictions, but some cessation of normal weekday activities is customary. Many Christians today observe Sunday as a day of church-attendance.

In Roman Catholic liturgy, Sunday begins on Saturday evening. The evening Mass on Saturday is liturgically a full Sunday Mass and fulfills the obligation of Sunday Mass attendance, and Vespers (evening prayer) on Saturday night is liturgically "first Vespers" of the Sunday. The same evening anticipation applies to other major solemnities and feasts, and is an echo of the Jewish practice of starting the new day at sunset. Those who work in the medical field, in law enforcement, and soldiers in a war zone are dispensed from the usual obligation to attend Church on Sunday. They are encouraged to combine their work with attending religious services if possible.

In the Eastern Orthodox Church, Sunday begins at the Little Entrance of Vespers (or All-Night Vigil) on Saturday evening and runs until "Vouchsafe, O Lord" (after the "prokeimenon") of Vespers on Sunday night. During this time, the dismissal at all services begin with the words, "May Christ our True God, who rose from the dead ...." Anyone who wishes to receive Holy Communion at Divine Liturgy on Sunday morning is required to attend Vespers the night before (see Eucharistic discipline). Among Orthodox Christians, Sunday is considered to be a "Little Pascha" (Easter), and because of the Paschal joy, the making of prostrations is forbidden, except in certain circumstances. Leisure activities and idleness, being secular and offensive to Christ as it is time-wasting, is prohibited.

Some languages lack separate words for "Saturday" and "Sabbath" (e. g. Italian, Portuguese). Outside the English-speaking world, Sabbath as a word, if it is used, refers to the Saturday (or the specific Jewish practices on it); Sunday is called the Lord's Day e. g. in Romance languages and Modern Greek. On the other hand, English-speaking Christians often refer to the Sunday as the Sabbath (other than Seventh-day Sabbatarians); a practice which, probably due to the international connections and the Latin tradition of the Roman Catholic Church, is more widespread among (but not limited to) Protestants. Quakers traditionally referred to Sunday as "First Day" eschewing the pagan origin of the English name, while referring to Saturday as the "Seventh day".

Some Christian denominations, called "Seventh-day Sabbatarians", observe a Saturday Sabbath. Christians in the Seventh-day Adventist, Seventh Day Baptist, and Church of God (Seventh-Day) denominations, as well as many Messianic Jews, have maintained the practice of abstaining from work and gathering for worship on Saturdays (sunset to sunset) as did all of the followers of God in the Old Testament.

Sunday in Mandaeism

Sunday in Mandaeism is called Habshaba (Habšaba). Mandaeans perform communal masbuta (baptism) every Sunday.

Common occurrences on Sunday

In government and business

In the United States and Canada, most government offices are closed on both Saturday and Sunday. The practice of offices closing on Sunday in government and in some rural areas of the United States stem from a system of blue laws. Blue laws were established in the early puritan days which forbade secular activities on Sunday and were rigidly enforced. Some public activities are still regulated by these blue laws in the 21st century. In 1985, twenty-two states in which religious fundamentalism remained strong maintained general restrictions on Sunday behavior. In Oklahoma, for example, it is stated: "Oklahoma's statutes state that "acts deemed useless and serious interruptions of the repose and religious liberty of the community," such as trades, manufacturing, mechanical employment, horse racing, and gaming are forbidden. Public selling of commodities other than necessary foods and drinks, medicine, ice, and surgical and burial equipment, and other necessities can legally be prohibited on Sunday. In Oklahoma, a fine not to exceed twenty-five dollars may be imposed on individuals for each offense." Because of these blue laws, many private sector retail businesses open later and close earlier on Sunday or do not open at all.

Many countries, particularly in Europe such as Sweden, France, Germany and Belgium, but also in other countries such as Peru, hold their national and local elections on a Sunday, either by law or by tradition.

In media
Many American and British daily newspapers publish a larger edition on Sundays, which often includes color comic strips, a magazine, and a coupon section. Others only publish on a Sunday, or have a "sister-paper" with a different masthead that only publishes on a Sunday.

North American radio stations often play specialty radio shows such as Casey Kasem's countdown or other nationally syndicated radio shows that may differ from their regular weekly music patterns on Sunday morning or Sunday evening. In the United Kingdom, there is a Sunday tradition of chart shows on BBC Radio 1 and commercial radio; this originates in the broadcast of chart shows and other populist material on Sundays by Radio Luxembourg when the Reithian BBC's Sunday output consisted largely of solemn and religious programmes.  The first Sunday chart show was broadcast on the Light Programme on 7 January 1962, which was considered a radical step at the time.  BBC Radio 1's chart show moved to Fridays in July 2015 but a chart update on Sundays was launched in July 2019.

Period or older-skewing television dramas, such as Downton Abbey, Call the Midwife, Lark Rise to Candleford and Heartbeat are commonly shown on Sunday evenings in the UK; the first of these was Dr Finlay's Casebook in the 1960s.  Similarly, Antiques Roadshow has been shown on Sundays on BBC1 since 1979 and Last of the Summer Wine was shown on Sundays for many years until it ended in 2010. On Sundays, BBC Radio 2 plays music in styles which it once regularly played but which are now rarely heard on the station, with programmes such as Elaine Paige on Sunday and Sunday Night is Music Night although more contemporary styles now make up a higher percentage of the station's Sunday output than previously; for example, Kendrick Lamar received a Sunday-night play on the station in March 2022. Even younger-skewing media outlets sometimes skew older on Sundays within the terms of their own audience; for example, BBC Radio 1Xtra introduced an "Old Skool Sunday" schedule in the autumn of 2019.

Many American, Australian and British television networks and stations also broadcast their political interview shows on Sunday mornings.

In sports

Major League Baseball usually schedules all Sunday games in the daytime except for the nationally televised Sunday Night Baseball matchup. Certain historically religious cities such as Boston and Baltimore among others will schedule games no earlier than 1:35 PM to ensure time for people who go to religious service in the morning can get to the game in time.

In the United States, professional American football in the National Football League is usually played on Sunday, although Saturday (via Saturday Night Football), Monday (via Monday Night Football), and Thursday (via Thursday Night Football or Thanksgiving) see some professional games. College football usually occurs on Saturday, and high-school football tends to take place on Friday night or Saturday afternoon.

In the UK, some club and Premier League football matches and tournaments usually take place on Sundays. Rugby matches and tournaments usually take place in club grounds or parks on Sunday mornings. It is not uncommon for church attendance to shift on days when a late morning or early afternoon game is anticipated by a local community.

The Indian Premier League schedules two games on Saturdays and Sundays instead of one, also called Double-headers.

One of the remains of religious segregation in the Netherlands is seen in amateur football: The Saturday-clubs are by and large Protestant Christian clubs, who were not allowed to play on Sunday. The Sunday-clubs were in general Catholic and working class clubs, whose players had to work on Saturday and therefore could only play on Sunday.

In Ireland, Gaelic football and hurling matches are predominantly played on Sundays, with the first (used to be second) and fourth (used to be third) Sundays in September always playing host to the All-Ireland hurling and football championship finals, respectively.

Professional golf tournaments traditionally end on Sunday. Traditionally, those in the United Kingdom ended on Saturday, but this changed some time ago; for example, the Open ran from Wednesday to Saturday up to 1979 but has run from Thursday to Sunday since 1980.

In the United States and Canada, National Basketball Association and National Hockey League games, which are usually played at night during the week, are frequently played during daytime hours - often broadcast on national television.

Most NASCAR Cup Series and IndyCar events are held on Sundays. Formula One World Championship races are always held on Sundays regardless of time zone/country, while MotoGP holds most races on Sundays, with Middle Eastern races being the exception on Saturday. All Formula One events and MotoGP events with Sunday races involve qualifying taking place on Saturday.

Astrology
Sunday is associated with the Sun and is symbolized by the symbol ☉.

Named days
 Advent Sunday
 Black Sunday
 Bloody Sunday
 Cold Sunday
 Easter Sunday represents the resurrection of Christ
 Gaudete Sunday is the third Sunday of Advent.
 Gloomy Sunday
 Good Shepherd Sunday is the fourth Sunday of Easter.
 Laetare Sunday is the fourth Sunday of Lent.
 Low Sunday, first Sunday after Easter, is also known as the Octave of Easter, White Sunday, Quasimodo Sunday, Alb Sunday, Antipascha Sunday, and Divine Mercy Sunday.
 Passion Sunday, the fifth Sunday of Lent as the beginning of Passiontide (since 1970 for Roman Catholics in the ordinary form of the rite, the term remains only official among the greater title of the Palm Sunday, which used to be also the "2nd Sunday of Passiontide")
 Palm Sunday is the Sunday before Easter.
 Selection Sunday
 Septuagesima, Sexagesima and Quinquagesima Sunday are the last three Sundays before Lent. Quinquagesima ("fiftieth"), is the fiftieth day before Easter, reckoning inclusively; but Sexagesima is not the sixtieth day and Septuagesima is not the seventieth but is the sixty-fourth day prior. The use of these terms was abandoned by the Catholic Church in the 1970 calendar reforms (the Sundays before Lent are now simply "Sundays in ordinary time" with no special status). However, their use is still continued in Lutheran tradition: for example, "Septuagesimae".
 Shavuot is the Jewish Pentecost, or 'Festival of Weeks'. For Karaite Jews it always falls on a Sunday.
 Stir-up Sunday is the last Sunday before Advent.
 Sunday Sunday single, by Blur (band)
 Super Bowl Sunday
 Trinity Sunday is the first Sunday after Pentecost.
 Whitsunday "White Sunday" is the day of Pentecost.

See also
 After Saturday Comes Sunday 
 Saint Kyriakē
 Sol Invictus
 Sunday Christian
 Sunday (computer virus)
 Sunday league football
 Sunday roast
 Sunday shopping

Notes

Sources
 Barnhart, Robert K. (1995). The Barnhart Concise Dictionary of Etymology. HarperCollins.

Further reading
 Bacchiocchi, Samuele. From Sabbath to Sunday: a historical investigation of the rise of Sunday observance in early Christianity (Pontifical Gregorian University, 1977)
 Cotton, John Paul. From Sabbath to Sunday: a study in early Christianity (1933)
 Kraft, Robert A. "Some Notes on Sabbath Observance in Early Christianity." Andrews University Seminary Studies (1965) 3: 18–33. online
 Land, Gary. Historical Dictionary of the Seventh-day Adventists] (Rowman & Littlefield, 2014)
 González, Justo. "A Brief History of Sunday: From the New Testament to the New Creation" (Eerdmans, 2017)

External links

 
1 Sunday
Christian Sunday observances
Helios